Lentibacillus juripiscarius is an aerobic, spore-forming, Gram-positive, moderately halophilic bacteria, with type strain IS40-3T (=JCM 12147T =PCU 229T =TISTR 1535T).

References

Further reading

External links
LPSN

Bacillaceae
Bacteria described in 2005